James Farmer (1823–1895) was a 19th-century Member of Parliament in the Waikato region, New Zealand.

He was appointed to the Legislative Council on 3 July 1871, and served until he resigned on 29 July 1874.

Having made his fortune from mining "speculation" at Thames he retired to live as a gentleman in London. On their 1875-76 visit to Britain, James Hector was delighted that Mrs Farmer takes all care of Mrs Hector off my hands which leaves me quite free (to visit fellow scientists).

References

1823 births
1895 deaths
Members of the New Zealand House of Representatives
Members of the New Zealand Legislative Council
New Zealand MPs for North Island electorates
19th-century New Zealand politicians